Alexey Kornienko (born 22 July 1976, in Namangan) is a Russian political figure and a deputy of the 5th, 6th, 7th, and 8th State Dumas.
 
In 2002, he started working as an assistant and then as a senior lecturer at the Ulyanovsk State Agricultural Academy. The same year, he joined the Communist Party of the Russian Federation. In 2003, he started working in the apparatus of the State Duma. In 2006, he taught at the Moscow Finance and Law Academy. On December 2, 2007, he was elected deputy of the 5th State Duma. In 2011, 2016, and 2021, he was re-elected deputy of the 6th, 7th, and 8th State Dumas, respectively.

References
 

 

1976 births
Living people
Communist Party of the Russian Federation members
21st-century Russian politicians
Eighth convocation members of the State Duma (Russian Federation)
Seventh convocation members of the State Duma (Russian Federation)
Sixth convocation members of the State Duma (Russian Federation)
Fifth convocation members of the State Duma (Russian Federation)
People from Namangan